The Moddey Dhoo  (Manx Gaelic, meaning "black dog") is a phantom black hound in Manx folklore that reputedly haunted Peel Castle on the west coast of the Isle of Man. The Manx name Moddey Dhoo was transcribed as Mauthe Doog by an influential 18th-Century English-speaking folklore source, which led to a history of misspellings of the proper name.

Old Legend
The English topographer and poet George Waldron seems to be the sole definitive written authority of this folklore localized in the castle. Waldron transcribes the original Manx name "Moddey Dhoo" as "Mauthe Doog", and describes the dog thus:

There used to be a passage connected to the Peel Castle, traversing the church grounds, leading to the apartment of the Captain of the Guard, and "the Mauthe Doog was always seen to come from that passage at the close of day, and return to it again as soon as the morning dawned".

Waldron reports that one drunken guard of the castle, who in defiance of the dog, went against the usual procedure of locking up the castle gate in pairs and did this all alone. Emboldened by liquor, he "snatched up the keys" when it wasn't even his turn to do so.  The watchman after locking up was supposed to use the haunted passage to deliver the keys to the captain. Some noises were heard, the adventurer returned to the guard-room, ghastly frightened, unable to share the story of what he had seen, and died three days later.

That was the last sighting of the dog. But the passage was sealed up and never used again after the haunting, and a different pathway constructed.

The dog was made known to the world at large when Sir Walter Scott introduced the "Manthe Dog -- a fiend, or demon, in the shape of a large, shaggy, black mastiff" in Peveril of the Peak (1823), an installment of his Waverley novels.  Here he freely adapted the folklore to suit his plot, but Scott derived knowledge of this folklore through Waldron's work (see below), as he candidly gave credit in his "author's notes". Note how Scott took liberty to scale up the size of the dog in his novel.

Modern sightings

William Walter Gill (d. 1963), has preserved some of the local lore regarding the Black Dog appearing around the Manx landscape, as well as firsthand eyewitness accounts:

A field near Ballamodda, near a field named Robin y Gate, "Robin of the Road," was haunted by an "ordinary moddey dhoo," as opposed to Ballagilbert Glen (aka Kinlye's Glen), where stood a farmhouse on the east side, and in the lane leading to it "lurked a moddey dhoo, headless like that at Hango."

Gill also reports sightings of Moddey Dhoo at a spot called "Milntown corner" close to Ramsey. In 1927, a friend saw it turning towards Glen Auldyn, and it was "black, with long shaggy hair, with eyes like coals of fire," and a doctor while driving the road beyond the corner 1931 encountered "a big black dog-like creature nearly the size of a calf, with bright staring eyes."

As to the version where the black dog is described "as big as a calf and with eyes like pewter plates", this seems to derive from a report of a modern sighting of the calf-sized dog, combined with the description of the eyes of a troll in Asbjornsen and Moe's Norwegian folktale collection.

In popular culture
A Moddey Dhoo features in Tom Siddell's Gunnerkrigg Court as a psychopomp, one of the many spirit guides that assist the dead with their transition.

"Mauthe Doog" appears in the video game Fire Emblem: The Sacred Stones as an enemy unit class.

"Mauthe Doog," a species of faerie canine, appear in Seanan McGuire's October Daye series.

See also

 Adhene
 Arkan Sonney
 Buggane
 Castle Rushen
 Fenodyree
 Glashtyn
 Jimmy Squarefoot
 Mooinjer veggey
 Sleih beggey

Footnotes

References

, volume 1, p. 241, volume 2, p. 184 "Manthe dog"
 (Andrew Lang edition, Boston, Dana & Estes, 1893), Author's Note p. 295- (quoting Waldron), and footnote (h) by Lang connecting it to Welsh tradition. 

Manx legendary creatures
Manx folklore
Mythological dogs
Mythological canines
Manx ghosts